Postfix may refer to:

 Postfix (linguistics), an affix which is placed after the stem of a word
 Postfix notation, a way of writing algebraic and other expressions
 Postfix (software), a mail transfer agent